Renan is a name present in Portuguese, Spanish, French, Turkish and Breton as an alternative form of Ronan. It may refer to:

People

Arts
 Ary Renan (1857–1900), French painter and activist
 Emile Renan (1913–2001), American operatic bass-baritone and stage director
 Ernest Renan (1823–1892), French philosopher and writer
 Henriette Renan (1811-1861), French writer
 Sergio Renán (1933–2015), Argentine actor, director, and screenwriter
 Renán Almendárez Coello (born 1953), Honduran-American radio broadcaster
 Renan Demirkan (born 1955), Turkish–German writer and actress
 Renan Luce (born 1980), Breton singer and songwriter

Sports
 Renan Barão (born 1987), Brazilian mixed martial arts fighter
 Renan Dal Zotto (born 1960), Brazilian volleyball player
 Renan Lavigne (born 1974), French squash player
 Renan Öztürk (born 1980), Turkish-American climber

Association football defenders
 Diego Renan (born 1990), Brazilian defender
 Renan Boufleur (born 1990), Brazilian defender
 Renán Calle (born 1976), Ecuadorian defender
 Renan Fonseca (born 1990), Brazilian defender

Association football forwards
 Renán Addles (born 1989), Panamanian forward
 Renan Augustinho Marques (born 1983), Brazilian striker

Association football goalkeepers
 Renan Brito Soares (born 1985), Brazilian goalkeeper
 Renan da Silva Moura (born 1984), Brazilian goalkeeper
 Renan dos Santos (born 1989), Brazilian goalkeeper
 Renan Nelson Rocha (born 1987), Brazilian goalkeeper
 Renan Ribeiro (born 1990), Brazilian goalkeeper
 Renan Soares Reuter (born 1990), Brazilian goalkeeper

Association football midfielders
 Bruno Renan (born 1991), Brazilian midfielder
 Marcos Renan de Mattos Ceschin (born 1985), Brazilian midfielder
 Marcos Renan Oliveira Santana (born 1990), Brazilian midfielder
 Renan Bardini Bressan (born 1988), Brazilian midfielder
 Renan Cardoso Domingues (born 1988), Brazilian midfielder
 Renan da Silva Costa (born 1987), Brazilian midfielder
 Renan Fernandes Garcia (born 1986), Brazilian midfielder
 Renan Foguinho (born 1989), Brazilian midfielder
 Renan Henrique Oliveira Vieira (born 1989), Brazilian midfielder
 Renan Miranda (born 1986), Brazilian midfielder
 Renan Paulino de Souza (born 1995), Brazilian midfielder
 Renan Santos Soares, Brazilian midfielder for U.D. Oliveirense
 Renan Silva (born 1989), Brazilian midfielder
 Renan Teixeira da Silva (born 1985), Brazilian midfielder
 Renan Wagner (born 1991), Brazilian midfielder

Others
 Renan Calheiros (born 1955), Brazilian politician
 Renán Elías (1915–1941), Peruvian aviator
 Renan Inestroza (born 1965), Honduran politician
 Renán Rodríguez (1912–1999), Uruguayan journalist and politician

Places
 Renan, Switzerland, a village in the canton of Berne
 Renan, Virginia, United States
 Saint-Renan, a commune in the Finistère department of France

Other uses
 Renan Airways, a defunct Moldovan airline

See also
 French cruiser Ernest Renan, in service 1906–1931
 Musée de la Vie Romantique, a French museum once known as Musée Renan-Scheffer